Black Hebrew Israelites (also called Hebrew Israelites, Black Hebrews, Black Israelites, and African Hebrew Israelites) are a new religious movement claiming that African Americans are descendants of the ancient Israelites. Some sub-groups believe that Native and Latin Americans are descendants of the Israelites as well. Black Hebrew Israelites combine elements to their teaching from a wide range of sources to varying degrees. Black Hebrew Israelites incorporate certain aspects of the religious beliefs and practices of both Christianity and Judaism, though they have created their own interpretation of the Bible, and other influences include Freemasonry and New Thought, for example. Many choose to identify as Hebrew Israelites or Black Hebrews rather than Jews in order to indicate their claimed historic connections.

Black Hebrew Israelites are not associated with the mainstream Jewish community, and they do not meet the criteria that are used to identify people as Jewish by the Jewish community. They are also outside the fold of mainstream Christianity. Black Hebrew Israelism is a non-homogenous movement with a number of groups that have varying beliefs and practices. Various sects of Black Hebrew Israelism have been criticized by academics for their promotion of historical revisionism.

The Black Hebrew Israelite movement originated at the end of the 19th century, when Frank Cherry and William Saunders Crowdy both claimed to have received visions that African Americans are descendants of the Hebrews in the Bible; Cherry established the Church of the Living God, the Pillar Ground of Truth for All Nations, in 1886, and Crowdy founded the Church of God and Saints of Christ in 1896. Subsequently, Black Hebrew groups were founded in the United States during the late 19th and early 20th centuries, from Kansas to New York City, by both African Americans and West Indian immigrants. In the mid-1980s, the number of Black Hebrews in the United States was between 25,000 and 40,000.

Some of the Black Hebrew Israelite sects are considered black supremacist and antisemitic. According to the Anti-Defamation League (ADL), "Some, but not all [Black Hebrew Israelites], are outspoken anti-Semites and racists." In 2017, the Southern Poverty Law Center (SPLC) listed the Black Hebrew Israelites as one of the "black nationalist groups of concern", along with the Nation of Islam and others.  The SPLC has also described the Black Hebrew Israelites as a hate group which supports segregation, Holocaust denial, homophobia and promotes a race war, and as of December 2019, it "lists 144 Black Hebrew Israelite organizations as black separatist hate groups because of their antisemitic and anti-white beliefs". The SPLC has since clarified that they now use the term "Radical Hebrew Israelite", to distinguish between extremist and non-extremist sects and to acknowledge that some Hebrew Israelites are non-Black.

History 
The origins of the Black Hebrew Israelite movement are found in Frank Cherry and William Saunders Crowdy, who both claimed that they had revelations in which they believed that God told them that African Americans are descendants of the Hebrews in the Christian Bible; Cherry established the "Church of the Living God, the Pillar Ground of Truth for All Nations" in 1886, and Crowdy founded the "Church of God and Saints of Christ" in 1896. Cherry taught that the Talmud was authoritative, that Jesus would return in the year A.D. 2000, and in a "square earth surrounded by three layers of heaven." The playing of the piano and the collection of tithes during Black Hebrew Israelite worship was forbidden by Cherry, who also taught the eastward direction of prayer and  "denigrated white Jews as interlopers". The Church of God and Saints of Christ, originating in Kansas, retained elements of a messianic connection to Jesus. Another early key figure was William Christian. The pioneers of the movement were Freemasons, and it was strongly influenced by Masonic traditions.

In the late 19th century, Cherry's and Crowdy's followers continued to propagate the claim that they were the biological descendants of the Israelites, and during the following decades, many more Black Hebrew congregations were established; after Frank Cherry's death in 1963, his son Prince Benjamin F. Cherry took over leadership of the Black Hebrew Israelite movement. After World War I, for example, Wentworth Arthur Matthew, an emigrant from Saint Kitts, founded another Black Hebrew congregation in Harlem, claiming descent from the ancient Israelites. He called it the "Commandment Keepers of the Living God". Similar groups selected elements of Judaism and adapted them within a structure similar to that of the Black church. Matthew incorporated his congregation in 1930 and moved it to Brooklyn, where he later founded the Israelite Rabbinical Seminary, where Black Hebrew rabbis have been educated and ordained.

The group sometimes employs street preaching to promote their ideology. Sidewalk ministers may employ provocation to advance a message that is often antisemitic, racist, and xenophobic. This primarily gained notice in the news through their street preaching that purportedly targeted students of Covington Catholic High School (Kentucky) in January 2019. One student reported the Black Hebrew Israelites called students 'racists', 'bigots', 'white crackers', 'faggots', and 'incest kids', and told an African American student that white classmates would "harvest his organs".

Groups 
During the late 19th and early 20th centuries, dozens of Black Hebrew organizations were established. In Harlem alone, at least eight such groups were founded between 1919 and 1931. 

Some of these include: 
 The Church of the Living God, the Pillar Ground of Truth for All Nations, is the oldest known Black Hebrew group. 
 The Church of God and Saints of Christ is one of the largest Black Hebrew organizations. 
 The Commandment Keepers, founded by Wentworth Arthur Matthew in New York, are noted for their adherence to traditional Judaism. 
 The African Hebrew Israelites of Jerusalem are widely known for having moved from the United States, primarily Chicago, to Israel in the late 20th century. 
 The Israelite School of Universal Practical Knowledge, based in Philadelphia
 The Nation of Yahweh, based in Miami, and whose founding members were accused of violent behavior including the murder of defecting members.

Church of the Living God, the Pillar Ground of Truth for All Nations 
The oldest known Black Hebrew organization is the Church of the Living God, the Pillar Ground of Truth for All Nations. The group was founded by Frank Cherry in Chattanooga, Tennessee, in 1886, and it later moved to Philadelphia. Cherry, who was from the Deep South and had worked as a seaman and for the railroads before his ministry, taught himself Hebrew and Yiddish. Theologically, the Church of the Living God mixed elements of Judaism and Christianity, counting the Bible—including the New Testament—and the Talmud as essential scriptures.

The rituals of Cherry's flock incorporated many Jewish practices and prohibitions alongside some Christian traditions. For example, during prayer the men wore skullcaps and congregants faced east. In addition, members of the Church were not permitted to eat pork. Prayers were accompanied by musical instruments and gospel singing. Cherry died in 1963, when he was about 95 years old; his son, Prince Benjamin F. Cherry, succeeded him. Members of the church believed that he had temporarily left and would soon reappear in spirit in order to lead the church through his son.

Church of God and Saints of Christ 

The Church of God and Saints of Christ was established in Lawrence, Kansas, in 1896 by African American William Saunders Crowdy. The group established its headquarters in Philadelphia in 1899, and Crowdy later relocated to Washington, D.C., in 1903. After Crowdy's death in 1908, the church continued to grow under the leadership of William Henry Plummer, who moved the organization's headquarters to its permanent location in Belleville, Virginia, in 1921.

In 1936, the Church of God and Saints of Christ had more than 200 "tabernacles" (congregations) and 37,000 members. Howard Zebulun Plummer succeeded his father and became head of the organization in 1931. His son, Levi Solomon Plummer, became the church's leader in 1975. The Church of God and Saints of Christ was led by Rabbi Jehu A. Crowdy, Jr., a great-grandson of William Saunders Crowdy, from 2001 until his death in 2016. Since 2016, it has been led by Phillip E. McNeil. As of 2005, the church had fifty tabernacles in the United States and dozens more in Africa.

The Church of God and Saints of Christ describes itself as "the oldest African-American congregation in the United States that adheres to the tenets of Judaism". The church teaches that all Jews were originally black and that African Americans are descendants of the lost tribes of Israel. Members believe that Jesus was neither God nor the son of God, but rather an adherent of Judaism and a prophet. They also consider William Saunders Crowdy, their founder, to be a prophet.

The Church of God and Saints of Christ synthesizes rituals from both Judaism and Christianity. They have adopted rites drawn from both the Old and New Testaments. Its Old Testament observances include the use of the Jewish calendar, the celebration of Passover, the circumcision of infant males, the commemoration of the Sabbath on Saturday, and the wearing of yarmulkes. Its New Testament rites include baptism (immersion) and footwashing, both of which have Old Testament origins.

Commandment Keepers 

Wentworth Arthur Matthew founded the Commandment Keepers Congregation in Harlem in 1919. Matthew was influenced by the non-black Jews he met as well as by Marcus Garvey and the Universal Negro Improvement Association and African Communities League. Garvey used the Biblical Jews in exile as a metaphor for black people in North America. One of the accomplishments of Garvey's movement was to strengthen the connection between black Americans and Africa, Ethiopia in particular. When Matthew later learned about the Beta Israel—Ethiopian Jews—he identified with them.

Today the Commandment Keepers follow traditional Jewish practices and observe Jewish holidays. Members observe kashrut, circumcise newborn boys, and celebrate Bar and Bat Mitzvahs, and their synagogue has a mechitza to separate men and women during worship.

The Commandment Keepers believe that they are descendants of Solomon and the Queen of Sheba. Matthew taught that "the Black man is a Jew" and "all genuine Jews are Black men", but he valued non-black Jews as those who had preserved Judaism over the centuries. Matthew maintained cordial ties with non-black Jewish leaders in New York and frequently invited them to worship at his synagogue.

Matthew established the Ethiopian Hebrew Rabbinical College (later renamed the Israelite Rabbinical Academy) in Brooklyn. He ordained more than 20 rabbis, who went on to lead congregations throughout the United States and the Caribbean. He remained the leader of the Commandment Keepers in Harlem, and in 1962 the congregation moved to a landmark building on 123rd Street.

Matthew died in 1973, sparking an internal conflict over who would succeed him as head of the Harlem congregation. Shortly before his death, Matthew named his grandson, David Matthew Doré, as the new spiritual leader. Doré was 16 years old at the time. In 1975, the synagogue's board elected Rabbi Willie White to be its leader. Rabbi Doré occasionally conducted services at the synagogue until the early 1980s, when White had Doré and some other members locked out of the building. Membership declined throughout the 1990s, and by 2004, only a few dozen people belonged to the synagogue. In 2007 the Commandment Keepers sold the building while various factions among former members sued one another.

Besides the Harlem group, there are eight or ten Commandment Keeper congregations in the New York area, and others exist throughout North America as well as in Israel. Since 2000, seven rabbis have graduated from the Israelite Rabbinical Academy founded by Matthew.

African Hebrew Israelites of Jerusalem 

Ben Ammi Ben-Israel established the African Hebrew Israelites of Jerusalem in Chicago, Illinois, in 1966, a time when black nationalism was on the rise as a response to the Civil Rights Movement. In 1969, after a sojourn in Liberia, Ben Ammi and around 30 Hebrew Israelites moved to Israel. Over the next 20 years, nearly 600 more members left the United States for Israel. As of 2006, about 2,500 Hebrew Israelites live in Dimona and two other towns in the Negev region of Israel, where they are widely referred to as Black Hebrews. In addition, there are African Hebrew Israelite communities in several major American cities, including Chicago, St. Louis, and Washington, D.C.

The Black Hebrews believe they are descended from members of the Tribe of Judah who were exiled from the Land of Israel after the Romans destroyed the Second Temple in 70 CE. The group incorporates elements of African-American culture into their interpretation of the Bible. They do not recognize rabbinical Jewish interpretations such as the Talmud. The Black Hebrews observe Shabbat and biblically ordained Jewish holidays such as Yom Kippur and Passover.

Men wear tzitzit on their African print shirts, women follow the niddah (biblical laws concerning menstruation), and newborn boys are circumcised. In accordance with their interpretation of the Bible, the Black Hebrews follow a strictly vegan diet and only wear natural fabrics. Most men have more than one wife, and birth control is not permitted.

When the first Black Hebrews arrived in Israel in 1969, they claimed citizenship under the Law of Return, which gives eligible Jews immediate citizenship. The Israeli government ruled in 1973 that the group did not qualify for automatic citizenship because they could not prove Jewish descent and had not undergone Orthodox conversion. The Black Hebrews were denied work permits and state benefits. The group accused the Israeli government of racist discrimination. In 1981, a group of American civil rights activists led by Bayard Rustin investigated and concluded that racism was not the cause of the Black Hebrews' situation. No official action was taken to return the Black Hebrews to the United States, but some individual members were deported for working illegally.

Some Black Hebrews renounced their American citizenship in order to try to prevent more deportations. In 1990, Illinois legislators helped negotiate an agreement that resolved the Black Hebrews' legal status in Israel. Members of the group are permitted to work, and they also have access to housing and social services. The Black Hebrews reclaimed their American citizenship and have received aid from the U.S. government, which helped them build a school and additional housing. In 2003 the agreement was revised, and the Black Hebrews were granted permanent residency in Israel.

In 2009, Elyakim Ben-Israel became the first Black Hebrew to gain Israeli citizenship. The Israeli government said that more Black Hebrews may be granted citizenship.

Today, young men and some women from the African Hebrew community of Jerusalem serve in the IDF, they have entered international sporting events and academic competitions under the Israeli flag, as well as having represented Israel twice in the Eurovision song contest.

The Black Hebrews of Israel maintain a popular gospel choir, which tours throughout Israel and the United States. The group owns restaurants in several Israeli cities. In 2003 the Black Hebrews garnered public attention when singer Whitney Houston visited them in Dimona. In 2006, Eddie Butler, a Black Hebrew, was chosen by the Israeli public to represent Israel in the Eurovision Song Contest.

One West Camp and splinter groups

The One West Camp is a messianic subdivision of Black Hebrew Israelite groups that believe in the Old Testament, the New Testament and the exclusive identification of the Twelve Tribes of Israel with ethnic communities of Black, Latin American, and Native American descent in the Americas. The camp is named after its first grouping, which was located at One West 125th Street in Harlem in New York City, then known as the 'Israeli School of Universal Practical Knowledge'. The movement has since splintered into numerous "camps", including the Israelite Church of God in Jesus Christ, and the Israelite School of Universal Practical Knowledge. Other notable groups descended from the One West Camp include the Gathering of Christ Church, Masharah Yasharahla, and Israel United in Christ.

Extremist fringe 
In late 2008, the Southern Poverty Law Center (SPLC) wrote that "the extremist fringe of the Hebrew Israelite movement" has a Black supremacist outlook. It wrote that the members of such groups "believe that Jews are devilish impostors and ... openly condemn Whites as evil personified, deserving only death or slavery". The SPLC wrote that "most Hebrew Israelites are neither explicitly racist nor anti-Semitic and do not advocate violence".

The Black Hebrew groups that are characterized as being Black supremacist by the SPLC include the Israelite School of Universal Practical Knowledge, the Nation of Yahweh and the Israelite Church of God in Jesus Christ. The Anti-Defamation League has written that the "12 Tribes of Israel" website, which is maintained by a Black Hebrew group, promotes Black supremacy.

As of December 2019, the Southern Poverty Law Center "lists 144 Black Hebrew Israelite organizations as black separatist hate groups because of their antisemitic and anti-white beliefs".

A 1999 FBI terrorism risk assessment report stated that "violent radical fringe members" of the Black Hebrew Israelite movement hold "beliefs [that] bear a striking resemblance to the Christian Identity theology practiced by many white supremacists". The 1999 assessment concluded that "the overwhelming majority of [Black Hebrew Israelites] are unlikely to engage in violence."

Attacks 
Alberta Williams King, the mother of Martin Luther King Jr. was shot and killed on June 30, 1974, at age 69, by Marcus Wayne Chenault, a 23-year-old Black man from Ohio, who had adopted the theology of a Black Hebrew Israelite preacher, Hananiah E. Israel of Cincinnati, and had shown interest in a group called the "Hebrew Pentecostal Church of the Living God". Israel, Chenault's mentor, castigated Black civil rights activists and Black church leaders as being evil and deceptive, but claimed in interviews not to have advocated violence. Chenault did not draw any such distinction, and first decided to assassinate Rev. Jesse Jackson in Chicago, but canceled the plan at the last minute. 

On December 10, 2019, two people who had expressed interest in the Black Hebrew Israelite movement were killed in a shootout with police. They had killed a police detective at Bayview Cemetery, and three people at the JC Kosher Supermarket in Jersey City, New Jersey. The victims were the Jewish co-owner of the grocery store, an employee, and a Jewish shopper. Authorities treated the incident as an act of domestic terrorism. 

Capers Funnye, who had been the rabbi for 26 years of the 200-member Beth Shalom B'nai Zaken Ethiopian Hebrew Congregation, condemned the attack and said that his community was "gripped by sadness" over "the heinous actions of two disturbed individuals who cloaked themselves in anti-Semitism and hate-filled rhetoric". He criticized the media reports by saying it was "unfortunate that the media uses the term 'Black Hebrew Israelites' without distinction as if the description is a one size fits all and it is absolutely not!". Funnye stated that "we don't want to be seen as some radical fringe group with a false narrative because we are black and profess Judaism; we are Torah-oriented Jews."

On December 28, 2019, a man with a machete attacked several Orthodox Jewish people during Hanukkah celebrations in a house in Monsey, New York. Authorities revealed that his journals included references to Black Hebrew Israelites, stating that "Hebrew Israelites" have taken from "ebinoid Israelites".

Criticism of theological and historical claims 
African American Christian apologetics organizations, such as the Jude 3 Project, have critiqued the theological and historical claims which have been presented by various Black Hebrew Israelite sects.

Zimbabwean novelist Masimba Musodza has stated that the doctrine which is taught by Black Hebrew Israelites "force[s] their own ideas onto the text to promote their own agenda, which serves no purpose at all except to engender antisemitism in Black communities in western countries". The historian Josephus, as well as theologians Emil Schürer and Friedrich Münter, wrote of Jewish slaves who were sold and served as labourers in Egypt and the Roman Empire, contradicting the Black Hebrew Israelite claim that Egypt is a metaphor for the Americas. Additionally, contrary to what is taught by Black Hebrew Israelites, no Kingdom of Judah existed in West Africa, and the Middle Eastern state has no connection with the Kingdom of Whydah. Black Hebrew Israelites have been criticized for making historical revisionist claims that do not acknowledge the poverty that Jews experienced as immigrants in the United States.

Fran Markowitz, a Professor of Cultural Anthropology at the Ben-Gurion University of the Negev, writes that the Hebrew Israelite view of the transatlantic slave trade conflicts with historical accounts, as does the Hebrew Israelite belief that Socrates and William Shakespeare were black.

Notable Black Hebrew Israelites

See also 

 African American–Jewish relations
 Afro-American religion
 Black Judaism
 Cultural appropriation
 Groups claiming affiliation with Israelites
 British Israelism
 Christian Identity
 French Israelism
 Nordic Israelism
 Hoteps
 Messianic Judaism
 Moorish Science Temple of America
 Pretendian
 Religion in Black America

References

Sources

Further reading

External links 

 Two Hebrew Israelite Biblical Verses Examined, The Times of Israel

 
1886 establishments in the United States
Religious organizations established in 1886
Groups claiming Israelite descent
Black separatism
Monotheistic religions
Groups claiming Jewish descent
African and Black nationalism in the United States